AmaZulu Game Reserve, is located in the KwaZulu-Natal, province of South Africa and has an area of about 10.000 hectares.

Wildlife 
Wildlife species include lion, African bush elephant, cheetah, South-central black rhinoceros, South African giraffe, warthog and hyena, as well as 15 different antelope species, hippopotamus and crocodile.

Accommodation 
 AmaKhosi Safari Lodge.

See also
 Protected areas of South Africa

Protected areas of KwaZulu-Natal